Rock'n Yodel is a studio album by Kikki Danielsson, released in April 1979 as her debut album as a solo artist. It peaked at number 13 on the Swedish Albums Chart. The title "Rock'n Yodel", which features Kikki Danielsson yodeling, charted at Svensktoppen for 10 weeks between 13 May–15 July 1979, peaking at 5th position.

Track listing

Side A

Side B

Charts

References

1979 debut albums
Kikki Danielsson albums